Modern Cornish (Kernuack Nowedga) is a variety of the revived Cornish language. It is sometimes called Revived Late Cornish (RLC) or Kernuack Dewethas, to distinguish it from other forms of contemporary revived Cornish.

When Unified Cornish came under heavy fire in the early 1980s, various attempts were made to rectify its problems. While some supporters stuck with original or modified UC, two main schisms arose, that of Kernewek Kemmyn led by Ken George, and that of Modern Cornish, led by Richard Gendall. Unlike Kernewek Kemmyn, which tended to go to medieval Cornish for inspiration, Modern Cornish uses the latest known forms of Cornish from the 17th and 18th centuries from writers such as Nicholas Boson, John Boson, William Rowe, Thomas Tonkin and others, and Anglo-Cornish dialect words of Brittonic origin. Proponents of Kernewek Kemmyn claim that the later forms of Cornish are corrupt and anglicised, but supporters of Modern Cornish such as Cussel an Tavas Kernuak counter this by saying that they are continuing the natural evolution of the tongue where it left off.

The orthography of Modern Cornish is a standardisation of the English-influenced orthographies of Cornish writers of the 17th and 18th centuries, and its grammar is more periphrastic than that of Middle Cornish-based varieties. It retains a number of English borrowings discarded by Kemmyn and Unified, e.g. wolcum instead of dynargh for 'welcome'. It makes sparing use of accents and diacritical marks. For instance, the word for 'good' typically spelt dâ, could also be written daa, and the word for 'month' could be spelt mîz or meez.

Cussel an Tavas Kernuak is the governing body of Modern Cornish. The need for standard spelling when learning a language has led Cussel an Tavas Kernuak to adopt the Modern Cornish spelling standardised by Gendall and Neil Kennedy.

Modern Cornish provided a source of input into the creation of the Standard Written Form of Cornish in 2008.

Example text
The following is a letter by William Bodinar, written in 1776, translated into Modern Cornish.

References
 A Student's Grammar of Modern Cornish by R.R.M. Gendall (The Cornish Language Council, 1991)
 Tavas a Ragadazow: The Language of My Forefathers by Richard Gendall (Teer ha Tavas, 2000)

External links
 Cussel an Tavas Kernuak website, with information on Modern Cornish and learning materials

Cornish language
Cornish language revival